Kispest (lit. Little Pest) is the 19th (XIX) district of Budapest, Hungary. It lies south-southeast of the historical Pest city. It was founded in 1871 on rural land as a village at the borderline of Pest, so it was named Kispest.

History 
From 1880 to 1990 Kispest's population increased from 1820 to 72,838. Kispest became part of Greater Budapest in 1950. When the Soviet troops re-entered Budapest to subdue the civil uprising in October/November 1956, they approached the city centre from the south-east, up the Üllői Street, with some of the first street clashes taking place in Kispest.

The huge panel housing estate (Kispest microdistrict) was built between the 1960s and the 1980s (12,100 flats, c. 33,000 inhabitants, making it the sixth-biggest housing estate/microraion in Budapest).

Wekerletelep 
Wekerletelep is Kispest's suburb with detached houses and green areas. It was named after the Hungarian premier at the time of the development in the 1900s, Sándor Wekerle. Its central square, Főtér, has two characteristic architectural gateways designed by the architect Károly Kós and based on Transylvanian building style. In May every year a festival called Wekerle Days (Hu: Wekerle Napok) takes place. This involves fun run, sports events, concerts and various other cultural and family oriented programss for all age groups.

Public transport  
The district is served by the Metro 3 (Kőbánya-Kispest and Határ út stations), so there is direct connection with the city center. Határ út underground station is the third-busiest in the city (after Deák Square and Örs vezér tere) with an estimated 40,000 passengers using it (often twice) on a typical workday.

Sport
Ferenc Puskás played football for Kispest F.C. (then called Kispest Honvéd FC) in the 1950s.

Budapest Honvéd FC, football team
Kispesti Textil SE, defunct football team
Kispest NKK, women's handball team, NB1/B second league

List of mayors

Gallery

Notes

References 



 
Urban planning in Hungary